Lionel Thomas Taylor (born August 15, 1935) is a former American football wide receiver and coach. Playing primarily with the Denver Broncos of American Football League (AFL), he led the league in receptions for five of the first six years of the league's existence. He was the third wide receiver to reach 500 receptions in pro football history.

College football
Taylor attended New Mexico Highlands University, where he had starred in basketball and track, earning all-conference wide receiver honors in 1956 and 1957.

Professional football
Taylor first played eight games as a linebacker with the Chicago Bears of the National Football League before moving to the Denver Broncos of the AFL for the 1960 season. With the Broncos, he switched positions and became a receiver. Third in all-time receptions (543) and receiving yards (6,872) for the Denver Broncos, Taylor was the Broncos' team MVP in 1963, 1964 and 1965, and an AFL All-Star in 1961, 1962 and 1965. An original Bronco, Taylor was part of the team's inaugural Ring of Fame class in 1984. Along with Lance Alworth, Charlie Hennigan and Sid Blanks, he shares the record for most receptions in one game with 13, doing so against the Oakland Raiders on November 29, 1964.

Taylor was the first professional football receiver ever to make 100 catches in a single season, accomplishing the feat in only 14 games (1961). He had four seasons with over 1,000 yards receiving, and averaged 84.7 catches per year from 1960 to 1965, then the highest six-year total in professional football history. , his 102.9 yards per game in 1960 remains a Broncos franchise record. Taylor completed his career with the Houston Oilers in 1967 and 1968.

In the time he played (1960-1968), the leading receiver in the AFL outmatched the leading receiver in the NFL each time except 1968. Taylor was the first receiver to have caught more than 90 passes in a single season, and he was also the first to do it twice. No receiver would lead the league in receptions over 90 in two separate seasons until Sterling Sharpe did so (1989, 1992, 1993). Taylor had a peak from 1960 to 1965 that resulted in 508 receptions for 6,424 yards and 43 touchdowns. In that same time, on the NFL side, Bobby Mitchell had 338 catches for 5,571 yards and 43 touchdowns. Curiously, Mitchell finished with more touchdowns and yards than Taylor but had less receptions and yards per game and managed to be inducted into the Pro Football Hall of Fame, while Taylor has not.

After his playing career, Taylor went into a long career as a coach. He was an assistant coach for two Super Bowl championship teams of the Pittsburgh Steelers in the 1970s and then the Los Angeles Rams.

Head coaching record

College

See also
 List of American Football League players

References

External links
 

1935 births
Living people
American football ends
American football wide receivers
Chicago Bears players
Cleveland Browns coaches
Denver Broncos (AFL) players
Houston Oilers players
London Monarchs coaches
Los Angeles Rams coaches
New Mexico Highlands Cowboys football players
Oregon State Beavers football coaches
Pittsburgh Steelers coaches
Texas Southern Tigers football coaches
American Football League All-Star players
American Football League All-League players
American Football League players
Players of American football from Kansas City, Missouri
Sportspeople from Kansas City, Missouri
African-American coaches of American football
African-American players of American football
21st-century African-American people
20th-century African-American sportspeople